Júlio Rodrigues Romão (born 29 March 1998) is a Brazilian professional footballer who plays as a midfielder for Qarabağ FK.

Career
On 18 August 2020, Romão signed a contract with C.D. Santa Clara. He made his professional debut with Santa Clara in a 1–0 Primeira Liga win over Braga on 25 September 2020.

He signed for Azerbaijan Premier League side Qarabağ on 17 July 2022.

References

External links

1998 births
Living people
Sportspeople from Rio de Janeiro (state)
Brazilian footballers
Association football midfielders
Primeira Liga players
Azerbaijan Premier League players
C.D. Santa Clara players
Qarabağ FK players
Brazilian expatriate footballers
Brazilian expatriate sportspeople in Portugal
Expatriate footballers in Portugal
Brazilian expatriate sportspeople in Azerbaijan
Expatriate footballers in Azerbaijan
People from Bedford Roxo